Juan José Silvestre Cantó (born 2 March 1980), commonly known as Jito, is a Spanish former footballer who played as a striker.

Club career
Jito was born in Barcelona, Catalonia. A veteran of 15 Segunda División B seasons, scoring 143 goals for a host of clubs, his professional input consisted of 22 Segunda División matches and three goals for Girona FC in 2008–09.

In August 2016, after three years in the third tier with Sestao River Club, Jito retired at the age of 36.

References

External links

1980 births
Living people
Spanish footballers
Footballers from Barcelona
Association football forwards
Segunda División players
Segunda División B players
Tercera División players
FC Barcelona C players
Real Oviedo Vetusta players
Palamós CF footballers
UD Almería players
Lorca Deportiva CF footballers
FC Cartagena footballers
CF Gavà players
UE Figueres footballers
UE Sant Andreu footballers
Orihuela CF players
Racing Club Portuense players
Girona FC players
Cultural Leonesa footballers
Deportivo Alavés players
SD Eibar footballers
Sestao River footballers